Dichocrocis tyranthes is a moth in the family Crambidae. It was described by Edward Meyrick in 1897. It is found on the Sangihe Islands in northern Indonesia.

References

Moths described in 1897
Spilomelinae